The 2018 BBL-Pokal was the 51st season of the German Basketball Cup, the domestic cup competition of the Basketball Bundesliga (BBL). On 6 June 2017, it was announced that the Top Four would be held at the Arena Ulm/Neu-Ulm in Ulm, which gained ratiopharm Ulm automatic qualification. The other six participating teams were selected through the standings in the 2017–18 Basketball Bundesliga.

Participants
The highest six teams qualified based on their standings in the first half of the 2017–18 Basketball Bundesliga qualify. ratiopharm Ulm qualified directly as the hosts of the tournament.

Bracket
The draw for the qualifying rounds was held on 7 January 2018.

Qualifying round

Top Four

Semifinals

Third place game

Final

See also
2017–18 Basketball Bundesliga

References

External links
Official website 

BBL-Pokal seasons
BBL-Pokal